"Wishful Drinking" is a song by American country music singers Ingrid Andress and Sam Hunt. It was made available digitally on August 2, 2021 and released to country radio on December 13, 2021. Andress co-wrote the song with Jonny Price, JP Saxe, Lucky Daye, and Rykeyz, and produced it with Jordan Schmidt. It is the lead single from Andress' second studio album Good Person.

Background and composition
"Wishful Drinking" is the first duet between the artists. Andress stated in a press release: "I've never done anything like 'Wishful Drinking' before, I've always wanted to work with Sam and have been such a fan of his for a long time. I admire how he stays so true to himself and am so happy to have him join me for my first collaboration. The song was co-written by my friend JP Saxe, and it became this amazing sad bop, which we all know I love". Hunt said: "I heard Ingrid's music a while back and knew right away she was a very talented singer and songwriter, I met her not long ago at a Nashville Sports League kickball game and I really enjoyed getting to know her a little bit. When the opportunity came along to be a part of this song with her, I was all in". Lauren Jo Black of Country Now described the song as "a story of a couple who is trying to move past a breakup and find themselves thinking of one another when they drink". Rolling Stone Jon Freeman stated that "Wishful Drinking" has a "sleek, R&B-flavored production" containing "hints of Dobro and acoustic guitar".

Critical reception
Luana Harumi of V Magazine wrote that the song "is a moving country-pop ballad that perfectly combines Andress's soft pitch and Sam Hunt's husky vocals". Kelly Brickey of Sounds Like Nashville commented that it "spins with a modern buzz that mixes clever lines with a strong beat over ice for a sound that goes down easy".

Music video
The music video was released on August 2, 2021, and filmed at the Flamingo Cocktail Club in Nashville, Tennessee. The video features "vintage-inspired fashion and '70s glam" and showcases Andress and Hunt "performing the song from across the room before getting up to sing on a small stage in the bar".

Charts

Weekly charts

Year-end charts

Certifications

Release history

References

2020s ballads
2021 singles
2021 songs
Ingrid Andress songs
Sam Hunt songs
Songs written by Ingrid Andress
Warner Records Nashville singles
Male–female vocal duets
Songs written by JP Saxe
Pop ballads
Country ballads